Zaim Muzaferija (9 March 1923 – 5 November 2003) was a Bosnian film, television and stage actor, and poet. The magazine 6yka (Buka) called Muzaferija a "legend of Bosnian cinema."

Biography
During World War II, Muzaferija was arrested in 1942 with a group of 36 anti-fascists. In his retirement he became a teacher of German and French.

Muzaferija became an actor when he was in his late 30s, his first film being Uzavreli grad (Boom Town), directed by Veljko Bulajić. The film premiered in February 1961.

Death
Muzaferija died on 5 November 2003 after a long illness. He was buried in a Muslim funeral 7 November 2003.

Filmography

Film

Television

Short films

References

External links

1923 births
2003 deaths
People from Visoko
Bosniaks of Bosnia and Herzegovina
Bosnia and Herzegovina Muslims
20th-century Bosnia and Herzegovina male actors
Bosniak poets
Bosniak writers
Bosnia and Herzegovina male film actors
Bosnia and Herzegovina male television actors
20th-century poets
Yugoslav male actors
Yugoslav poets